= Ammonium hexafluoroniobate =

Names
- IUPAC name Ammonium hexafluoroniobate(V)

Identifiers
CAS Number	12062-13-4
3D model (JSmol)	Interactive image
ChemSpider	16002040
EC Number	235-046-2
PubChem CID	53393469
- InChI: InChI=1S/6FH.H3N.Nb/h6*1H;1H3;/q;;;;;;;+5/p-5 Key: SKIHFCFFRXCIJA-UHFFFAOYSA-I
- SMILES: [NH4+].F[Nb-](F)(F)(F)(F)F

Properties
Chemical formula	F_{6}H_{4}NNb
Molar mass	224.936 g·mol^{−1}
Appearance	White crystalline powder
Density	g/cm^{3}

Hazards
- GHS labelling
Pictograms	(GHS07: Exclamation mark)
Signal word	Warning
Hazard statements	H302, H312, H332
Precautionary statements	P261, P264, P264+P265, P270, P271, P280, P301+P317, P302+P352, P304+P340, P305+P351+P338, P317, P319, P321, P330, P332+P317, P337+P317, P362+P364, P403+P233, P405, P501
- Except where otherwise noted, data are given for materials in their standard state (at 25 °C [77 °F], 100 kPa). Infobox references

Ammonium hexafluoroniobate is an inorganic chemical compound with the chemical formula NH_{4}NbF_{6}.

== Physical properties ==
Ammonium hexafluoroniobate forms white crystals of hexagonal system, space group R3m, insoluble in water.

== Uses ==
The compound is used as a solvent for organics.
